Rigotti is an Italian surname. Notable people with the surname include:

Alessandro Rigotti (born 1978), Italian voice actor
Annibale Rigotti (1870-1968), Italian architect
Carlo Rigotti (1906-1983), Italian football player
Hans Rigotti (born 1947), German football player

Italian-language surnames